Maldon is a historic railway station on the Victorian Goldfields Railways Maldon branch line, off the main Bendigo, Echuca and Swan Hill lines in central Victoria, Australia. It was once the junction station for the Shelbourne Extension

History 
The station was originally opened on 16 June 1884. Passenger services ceased on 6 January 1941, and after that the line was used for goods traffic until its closure on 3 December 1976. In March 1986, the station was re-opened by the Victorian Goldfields Railway (VGR) for tourist services over a short 1 km section of the line out of Maldon. The line has since been extended to its former junction point at Castlemaine.

On 20 October 2009, the roof, kitchen and stationmaster's office were extensively damaged by fire.

Platforms & Services 
The station has one platform. It is served by VGR tourist trains to Castlemaine.

References 

Victoria (Australia) tourist railway stations